"T'd Up" is a single by American hip hop duo Rae Sremmurd. It was released on February 5, 2018 by EarDrummers and Interscope Records as the second single from their third studio album SR3MM (2018). It was produced by St. Louis producers Metro Boomin, ChopSquad DJ and Swae Lee while being written by the producers and the duo.

Background
The song was announced by Mike Will Made It via Twitter the day before release, while revealing the song's producers. "T'd Up" followed the announcement of Rae Sremmurd's third album SR3MM, originally titled SremmLife 3. The album is a triple-disc album featuring SR3MM and solo albums from Rae Sremmurd members Swae Lee, titled Swaecation, and Slim Jxmmi, titled Jxmtroduction.

Live performances
The day before release, "T'd Up" was performed by Rae Sremmurd at Super Bowl LIVE in Minneapolis, in preparation for Super Bowl LII.

Personnel
Credits adapted from Tidal.

 Khalif "Swae Lee" Brown – production, songwriting
 Aaquil "Slim Jxmmi" Brown – songwriting
 Leland "Metro Boomin" Wayne – production, songwriting
 Darrel Jackson – production
 Jaycen Joshua – mixing

Charts

Release history

References

2018 songs
2018 singles
Rae Sremmurd songs
Interscope Records singles
Songs written by Swae Lee
Songs written by Metro Boomin
Song recordings produced by Metro Boomin
Songs written by Slim Jxmmi